Frederick Gordon Klinck (3 June 1865 – 11 August 1893) was a South African cricketer who played for Transvaal in the 1890s.

Born in Port Elizabeth, Klinck was educated at The King's School, Canterbury, and Diocesan College, Cape Town. He represented Kimberley in inter-provincial cricket in the 1880s in the period before such matches had first-class status.

In the match between a Cape Colony XV and the touring English team in January 1889, Klinck displayed "his well-known hitting powers" and scored 81, easily the highest score on either side, and the Cape Colony team won by 10 wickets. He represented Transvaal in the first seasons on the Currie Cup, but died only months after his last match, aged 28.

References

External links
 
 Frederick Klinck at CricketArchive

1865 births
1893 deaths
Alumni of Diocesan College, Cape Town
People educated at The King's School, Canterbury
South African cricketers
Gauteng cricketers
Cricketers from Port Elizabeth